is a railway station operated by JR West on the Gantoku Line in Shūnan, Yamaguchi. It is located in the Kumage part of Shūnan, in a semi-rural area.

History

March 27, 1987: Station opens
April 1, 1987: Station operation is taken over by JR West after privatization of Japanese National Railways

Layout
The station has one track, with one side platform serving both directions of travel.

Adjacent stations
West Japan Railway (JR West)

See also
 List of railway stations in Japan

External links

  
 Shūnan City website 

Railway stations in Yamaguchi Prefecture
Railway stations in Japan opened in 1987
Shūnan, Yamaguchi